Heather Firbank (27 August 1888 – 13 April 1954) was an English socialite, now known for her fine collection of clothes kept at the Victoria and Albert Museum (V&A), London. 
Her father Sir Joseph Thomas Firbank (1850–1910) was a British Conservative politician, while her grandfather Joseph Firbank (1819–1886) built the family fortune as a railway contractor. Her older brother Ronald Firbank became famous after his death for his innovative novels.

Heather Firbank was born in England on 27 August 1888, at The Coopers, Chislehurst, Kent, the youngest of the four children of Sir Thomas and Lady Firbank, who was formerly Harriet Jane Garrett. She had three elder brothers, Joseph Sydney (1884–1904), Arthur Annesley Ronald (1886–1926), the novelist, and Hubert Somerset (1887–1913).  She was educated at home by a governess and was presented at Court on 15 May 1908.

Heather Firbank bought her clothes from highly regarded dressmakers and tailors in London, including Lucile, Mascotte, Redfern, Frederick Bosworth, Russell & Allen, Kate Reily, and the department store Woolland Brothers in Knightsbridge. The evening gown illustrated at right was designed by Lucile, one of the leading couturiers from the late 1890s to the early 1920s. The dress was named "El Dorado" and first appeared in Lucile's Spring 1913 collection.

Two of Firbank's brothers died in their twenties, her father in 1910, and her mother in 1924. When her brother Ronald, the last member of her immediate family, died in 1926, she put most of her clothes into storage. She never married, and after her death in 1954 her wardrobe was inherited by her nephew, Lieutenant-Colonel Thomas Firbank (1910–2000). The extensive collection then came to the attention of the Victoria and Albert Museum and was acquired in 1957, becoming the foundation for the museum's well-known collection of 20th century fashion. An exhibition of Firbank's clothes was held at the V&A in 1960 entitled A Lady of Fashion: Heather Firbank (1888-1954) and what she wore between 1908 and 1921. Other items from Heather Firbank's extraordinary wardrobe survive in the Museum of London, the Gallery of Costume in Manchester, Nottingham Museum, Leicester Museum, and Northampton Museum.

The V&A's Firbank collection is the subject of its publication entitled London Society Fashion 1905-1925: The Wardrobe of Heather Firbank, by Cassie Davies-Strodder, Jenny Lister and Lou Taylor.

References

Further reading
Adburgham, Alison, Shops and Shopping 1800-1914 Where, and in what manner the well-dressed Englishwoman bought her Clothes (Barrie & Jenkins, London 1964)
Benkovitz, Miriam, Ronald Firbank A Biography (Weidenfeld and Nicolson, London, 1969)
Bigham, Randy Bryan, Lucile - Her Life by Design (MacEvie Press Group, San Francisco, 2012)
Davies – Strodder, Cassie, Lister, Jenny and Taylor, Lou, London Society Fashion 1905-1925: The Wardrobe of Heather Firbank (V&A, London, 2015)
de la Haye, Amy and D. Mendes, Valerie, Lucile Ltd. London, Paris, New York and Chicago 1890s – 1930s (V&A,London 2009)
Hobson, Anthony, Ronald Firbank: Letters To His Mother 1920-1924, (Verona, Verona, 2001)

Archive material
Firbank, Heather, Letters to Ronald Firbank, Ronald Firbank Collection of papers, 1896–1952, The Berg Collection, (MSS Firbank), The New York Public Library, New York
Firbank, Ronald, Letters to Heather Firbank, Fales Manuscript Collection ca.1700-2000, (MSS001), Fales Library, NEW York University, New York
Heather Firbank archive, Archive of Art and Design, Victoria and Albert, Museum, London

English socialites
People from Chislehurst
1888 births
1954 deaths